Borelli's marked gecko (Homonota borellii) is a species of lizard in the family Phyllodactylidae. The species is endemic to South America.

Etymology
The specific name, borellii, is in honor of French-born Italian ornithologist Alfredo Borelli.

Geographic range
H. borrellii is found in Argentina and Paraguay.

Habitat
The preferred natural habitats of H. borellii are grassland, shrubland, and savanna.

Reproduction
H. borellii is oviparous.

References

Further reading
Gallardo JM (1969). "Las especies de saurios (Reptilia) de la Provincia de Santa Fe, Argentina, y consideraciones sobre su ecologia y zoogeografia". Neotropica 15 (47): 73–81. (in Spanish).
Peracca MG (1897). "Viaggio del Dott[or]. Alfredo Borelli nel Chaco boliviano e nella Repubblica Argentina. Rettili ed Anfibi ". Bolletino dei Musei di Zoologia ed Anatomia comparata della R[egia]. Università di Torino 12 (274): 1–19. (Gymnodactylus borellii, new species, pp. 2–3). (in Italian).
Rösler H (2000). "Kommentierte Liste der rezent, subrezent und fossil bekannten Geckotaxa (Reptilia: Gekkonomorpha)". Gekkota 2: 28–153. (Homonota borellii, p. 89). (in German).

Homonota
Reptiles of Argentina
Reptiles of Paraguay
Reptiles described in 1897
Taxa named by Mario Giacinto Peracca